2006 Division Series may refer to:

2006 American League Division Series
2006 National League Division Series